Oceaniidae is one of the over 50 cnidarian families of the order Anthomedusae. It contains nearly 50 species in ten genera.

Genera 
Corydendrium (11 species)
Corystolona (monotypic)
Merona (5 species)
Oceania (6 species)
Pachycordyle (disputed)
Rhizogeton (7 species)
Similomerona (monotypic)
Tubiclava (5 species)
Turritopsis (11 species)
Turritopsoides (monotypic)

References 

 
Filifera
Cnidarian families